Sastavak is a village in Croatia, under the Slunj township, in Karlovac County.

References

Geography of Croatia
Populated places in Karlovac County